Walliswil bei Niederbipp is a municipality in the Oberaargau administrative district in the canton of Bern in Switzerland.

Geography
Of this area, 53.5% is used for agricultural purposes, while 18.8% is forested. Of the rest of the land, 17.4% is settled (buildings or roads) and the remainder (10.4%) is non-productive (rivers, glaciers or mountains).

Demographics

, 1.3% of the population was made up of foreign nationals. Over the last 10 years the population has grown at a rate of 5.7%. Most of the population speaks German  (99.2%), with English being second most common ( 0.4%) and Russian being third ( 0.4%).

In the 2007 election the most popular party was the SVP which received 47.2% of the vote.  The next three most popular parties were the SPS (17.4%), the FDP (11.4%) and the CSP (9.1%).

The age distribution of the population is children and teenagers (0–19 years old) make up 18% of the population, while adults (20–64 years old) make up 61.9% and seniors (over 64 years old) make up 20.1%.  In Walliswil bei Niederbipp about 71.9% of the population (between age 25–64) have completed either non-mandatory upper secondary education or additional higher education (either university or a Fachhochschule).

Walliswil bei Niederbipp has an unemployment rate of 1.86%.  , there were 13 people employed in the primary economic sector and about 4 businesses involved in this sector.  15 people are employed in the secondary sector and there are 1 business in this sector.  36 people are employed in the tertiary sector, with 5 businesses in this sector.

References

Municipalities of the canton of Bern